Luccombe may refer to the following places in England:

 Luccombe, Isle of Wight
 Luccombe, Somerset
 East Chelborough, Dorset, also known as Luccombe